The AN/BLQ-11 autonomous unmanned undersea vehicle (formerly the Long-Term Mine Reconnaissance System (LMRS)) is a torpedo tube-launched and tube-recovered underwater search and survey unmanned undersea vehicle (UUV) capable of performing autonomous minefield reconnaissance as much as  in advance of a host -, -, or -class submarine.

LMRS is equipped with both forward-looking sonar and side-scan synthetic aperture sonar.

Boeing concluded the detailed design phase of the development project on 31 August 1999.
In January 2006,  successfully demonstrated homing and docking of an LMRS UUV system during at-sea testing.

Citations

Sources
http://auvac.org/platforms/view/128

Equipment of the United States Navy
Autonomous underwater vehicles